The Second Ganzouri Cabinet was led by Egyptian prime minister Kamal Ganzouri from 7 December 2011 to 26 June 2012. 28 ministers were sworn into Ganzouri's cabinet. The Cabinet headquarters in Cairo were the site of protests in mid-December 2011.

List of Ministers

References

Cabinets of Egypt
2011 establishments in Egypt
2012 disestablishments in Egypt
Cabinets established in 2011
Cabinets disestablished in 2012